The F. W. Lewis House is a single-family home located at 2913 Manor Street in Midland, Michigan. It was listed on the National Register of Historic Places in 1989.

History
F.W. Lewis was an accountant at the Dow Chemical Company. In 1933, he hired architect Alden B. Dow to design this home. It was Dow's first foray into a low-priced home design, something that interested the architect throughout his life. Clapboard siding was added to the house some time in the 1960s. A single car garage was added about the same time.

Description
The F. W. Lewis House is a single-story, 900 square foot house configured in a square. The house is topped with a broad hip roof, and a unit block chimney, which also serves to delineate the interior spaces of the house into public and private areas. The exterior is clad in clapboard, over the original masonite sheets. A band of casement windows runs across the front. Each of the casement windows pivot from the top for ventilation. On the interior, the front contains a living room and kitchen/dining area, and the rear contains two bedrooms.

References

		
National Register of Historic Places in Midland County, Michigan
International style architecture in Michigan
Residential buildings completed in 1933
Alden B. Dow buildings
Midland, Michigan